Camille Bérubé (born 21 May 1995) is a Canadian Paralympic swimmer who competes in international elite swimming competitions. She is a three-time Parapan American Games medalist and has competed at the Paralympic Games three times.

Personal life
Bérubé has limited use of her legs after she was diagnosed with cancer at birth, doctors removed a tumour in her lower back which caused the partial paralysis.

References

External links
 
 

1995 births
Living people
Medalists at the 2015 Parapan American Games
Medalists at the World Para Swimming Championships
Paralympic swimmers of Canada
Sportspeople from Gatineau
Swimmers at the 2012 Summer Paralympics
Swimmers at the 2016 Summer Paralympics
Swimmers at the 2020 Summer Paralympics
Canadian female backstroke swimmers
Canadian female breaststroke swimmers
Canadian female medley swimmers
Swimmers at the 2022 Commonwealth Games
Commonwealth Games medallists in swimming
Commonwealth Games bronze medallists for Canada
21st-century Canadian women
Medallists at the 2022 Commonwealth Games